Dmitri Gromov (born July 2, 1991) is a Russian professional ice hockey defenceman who plays for the Torpedo Ust-Kamenogorsk of the Supreme Hockey League. (VHL)

Gromov was selected 6th overall in the 2009 KHL Junior Draft by Severstal Cherepovets but only managed to play just three games in the Kontinental Hockey League for the team.

Career statistics

Regular season and playoffs

External links

1991 births
Living people
Dizel Penza players
Ice hockey people from Moscow
Russian ice hockey defencemen
Saryarka Karagandy players
Severstal Cherepovets players
Sputnik Nizhny Tagil players
HC Temirtau players
Tsen Tou Jilin City players